Trần Văn Hữu (1895 – 17 January 1985) served as president of the government of Cochinchina from 1948 to 1949, then as Prime Minister of the State of Vietnam from 1950 to 1952.

Early life
He was born in 1895, in Long My village, Chau Thanh district , Vinh Long province (now Thanh Duc commune, Long Ho district, Vinh Long province) into a wealthy landowner family. His house is in the same village as Trần Văn Hương (later Prime Minister of the Republic of Vietnam), while Phạm Hùng's house (later Prime Minister of the Socialist Republic of Vietnam) is located opposite the other side of the Long Hồ River (belonging to Vietnam). Long Phuoc village ). His father held the position of incense in the village. At a young age, Tran Van Huu studied the French program. Growing up, he went to France to study and graduated with a degree in agricultural engineering. When he returned home, he worked at a real estate bank.

Life abroad
He lived in France after Ngô Đình Diệm came to power in 1954 in South Vietnam and worked to undermine the Diệm regime. Hữu served as leader of the Committee for Peace and Renewal of South Vietnam, an organization that lobbied for peace and the neutralization of Vietnam in the Cold War. As part of this mission, in 1966 he visited Pope Paul VI and the United Nations Secretary General U Thant.

Because of his lobbying efforts and past political standing, Hữu was an ally of the National Liberation Front (NLF) in Paris. In 1969, the leadership of the NLF proposed Hữu as a possible minister of a new NLF government.

References

1895 births
1985 deaths